Edwin Gray (July 18, 1743ca. 1817) was an 18th-century and 19th-century politician and lawyer from Virginia.

Born in Southampton County, Virginia, Gray attended the College of William & Mary and later served in the House of Burgesses from 1769 to 1775. He was a member of the Virginia Convention in 1774, 1775 and 1776, a member of the Virginia House of Delegates in 1776, 1779, 1787, 1788 and 1791 and a member of the Virginia State Senate from 1777 to 1779. Gray was elected a Democratic-Republican to the United States House of Representatives in 1798, serving from 1799 to 1813. He was unsuccessful in an 1815 bid for the seat. He died in Nansemond County, Virginia about 1817.

External links

1743 births
1810s deaths
House of Burgesses members
Members of the Virginia House of Delegates
Virginia state senators
College of William & Mary alumni
Virginia lawyers
Democratic-Republican Party members of the United States House of Representatives from Virginia